Pedro Ballester may refer to:

 Pedro Ballester, a village in the municipality Primero de Enero
 Pedro Ballester (baseball) (born 1924), Cuban shortstop in the Negro leagues